Fate's Right Hand is the eleventh studio album by American country music singer Rodney Crowell. It was released on July 29, 2003 via Epic Records. The album includes Crowell's last charting single, "Earthbound", which spent one week at the number 60 position on Hot Country Songs.

Critical reception
Thom Jurek of Allmusic gave the album four-and-a-half stars out of five. His review said that it was "the finest record Crowell has issued since Diamonds & Dirt and may turn out to be the finest of his entire career".

Track listing

Personnel

 Richard Bennett – electric guitar, hi-string guitar
 Pat Buchanan – electric guitar
 John Cowan – background vocals
 Rodney Crowell – bouzouki, acoustic guitar, baritone guitar, electric guitar, lead vocals
 Jerry Douglas – Dobro
 Béla Fleck – banjo
 Tony Harrell – organ
 John Hobbs – organ
 Carl Jackson – background vocals
 John Jorgenson – electric guitar, mandolin
 Will Kimbrough – accordion, Dobro, baritone guitar
 Trey Landrey – drums
 Paul Leim – djembe, drums, percussion
 Billy Livsey – harmonium, keyboard programming, organ
 Charlie McCoy – harmonica
 Jerry McPherson – electric guitar
 Greg Morrow – drums
 Marcia Ramirez – background vocals
 David Rawlings – background vocals
 Michael Rhodes – bass guitar
 Kim Richey – background vocals
 Chris Rodriguez – acoustic guitar
 Barbara Santoro – background vocals
 Vince Santoro – drums, background vocals
 Russell Smith – background vocals
 Steuart Smith – electric guitar
 Randall Waller – background vocals
 Gillian Welch – background vocals

Chart performance

Album

Singles

References

2003 albums
Epic Records albums
Rodney Crowell albums
Albums produced by Rodney Crowell